The UEFA European Championship is the main football competition of the men's national football teams governed by UEFA (the Union of European Football Associations). Held every four years since 1960, in the even-numbered year between World Cup tournaments, it was originally called the UEFA European Nations Cup, changing to the current name in 1968. Starting with the 1996 tournament, specific championships are often referred to in the form "Euro 2008" or whichever year is appropriate. Prior to entering the tournament, all teams other than the host nations (which qualify automatically) compete in a qualifying process.

Belgium have participated in six UEFA European Championships finals, those held in 1972, 1980, 1984, 2000, 2016, and 2020, which was postponed to 2021 due to the COVID-19 pandemic. As of 2 July 2021, they have played 22 matches: eleven wins, two draws and nine losses.

Overview

Overall record
 Champions   Runners-up   Third place   Fourth Place

List of matches

Euro 1972

Belgium hosted the European Championship twice, as they were chosen amongst the four semi-finalists to host the event, and ended third by beating Hungary.

Final tournament

Semi-finals

Third place play-off

Euro 1980

Under the guidance of manager Guy Thys, Belgium achieved their best European result at the 1980 edition in Italy. After finishing first in the group phase, before football nations Italy, England and Spain, Belgium stood in the final against West Germany. After the German opener from Horst Hrubesch and the penalty equalizer from René Vandereycken, the match seemed to go in extra time. Two minutes before the end of the regular playing time, Hrubesch's second goal ended the Belgian dream of winning a first major (non-Olympic) tournament.

Group stage

Knockout stage

Final

Euro 1984

At UEFA Euro 1984 the road to the knockout stage seemed open after taking a 2–0 lead in their last group match against Denmark, but the Red Devils could not prevent Danish Dynamite to turn the tide in their favour.

Group stage

Euro 2000
The Belgian team was one of the major disappointments of the 2000 edition with a first-round exit. This early exit was fairly unexpected since during the eight preparational friendlies for Euro 2000 under Robert Waseige Belgium played well, winning three times convincingly and losing only once (2–1 against England). At Euro 2000, Belgium first won against Sweden 2–1 via goals from Bart Goor in the 43rd minute and Émile Mpenza in the 46th minute against Sweden's one by Johan Mjallby in the 53rd minute after a terrible error of goalkeeper Filip De Wilde. In the second match, Belgium lost 2–0 against the eventual tournament runners-up Italy by a header from Francesco Totti in the fifth minute and Stefano Fiore's goal of the tournament (according to the United Kingdom's Match of the Day television programme) in the 66th minute. In the crucial match where Belgium needed one more point to move ahead to the quarter-finals, they lost 2–0 against Turkey (two goals from Hakan Şükür in the 45th after another error of goalkeeper Filip De Wilde, and 70th minute). In the 83rd minute of that last group match, De Wilde even ended his tournament, being sent off for attacking Arif Erdem outside the penalty area.

Group stage

Euro 2016

Just like in Belgium's previous Euro tournament in 2000, they lost 2–0 to Italy in the group phase. In spite of winning with broad margins against the Republic of Ireland (3–0) and Hungary (4–0) at UEFA Euro 2016, Belgium's second very talented generation disappointed with a quarter-final exit. As during the tournament's qualifiers, Wales got the better of Belgium, with a 3–1 win.

Group stage

Knockout phase

Round of 16

Quarter-finals

Euro 2020

Group stage

Knockout phase

Round of 16

Quarter-finals

Goalscorers

See also
 Belgium national football team records
 Belgium at the FIFA World Cup

Notes

References

 
Countries at the UEFA European Championship
European record